The 1892–93 season was the tenth to be played by the team now known as Bristol Rovers, and their ninth playing under the name Eastville Rovers. It was significant in that it was their first year competing in an organised league, when they became founder members of the Bristol & District League (now known as the Western League).

Season review
Rovers finished in sixth place in the league. They had to a slow start to their campaign, but finished strongly, winning their last four games. There was some confusion surrounding the game against St George on 22 October, which although originally arranged as a league match it was played as a friendly as no referee had been appointed.

League table

Match results

Bristol & District League

 Eastville Rovers were nominally the home team, but the match was played at Mangotsfield
 Game stopped after 78 minutes due to poor light
 Wells only fielded ten players

Gloucestershire Senior Challenge Cup

Gloucestershire Junior Challenge Cup

Friendlies

First team

 The game against St George on 22 October was originally scheduled to be a league match, but was played as a friendly when it was discovered that no referee had been appointed.
 Swindon Athletic began the game with eight players, but were brought up to full strength when three substitutes were found.

Reserves

Statistics
Friendly matches are not included in this section.

Cumulative record
The total cumulative record of Eastville Rovers up to the end of the 1892–93 season is shown below. This is calculated by adding the numbers in the section above to the total games played up to the end of the previous season. Friendly matches are not included in this table, and games held at neutral venues are considered to have been played away from home.

References

Bibliography

Bristol Rovers F.C. seasons
Eastville Rovers